PP-20 Rawalpindi-XIV is a Constituency of Provincial Assembly of Punjab.

From 2018 PP-20 Rawalpindi-XV Become 15tn Constituency of Provincial Assembly of Punjab Before it was Part of PP-14 (Rawalpindi-XIV) (1)Wah Cantonment of Taxila Tehsil of Rawalpindi District.

2018

2023

See also
 PP-19 Rawalpindi-XIII
 PP-21 Chakwal-I

References

External links
 https://www.ecp.gov.pk/Documents/delimitation2018finalissued/1.%20PP.pdf

R